Coelonia solani is a moth of the family Sphingidae. It is known from Mauritius, Réunion (formerly known as Île Bourbon), Madagascar and the Comoro Islands. It is a pollinator of some species of baobab in Madagascar, including Adansonia za.

Subspecies
Coelonia solani solani (Mauritius, Réunion, Madagascar)
Coelonia solani comoroana Clark, 1927 (Comoros)

References

Acherontiini
Moths described in 1833
Moths of Madagascar
Moths of the Comoros
Moths of Mauritius
Moths of Réunion